Medium Gasoline Engine (MGE) is a medium-displacement 4-cylinder gasoline engine developed by Opel Automobile GmbH and marketed as 'SIDI Ecotec'.

History 
Production began in late 2012 at Szentgotthárd, Hungary. The engine features Start/Stop and reduces fuel consumption and CO2 emissions by 13 percent comparing to the predecessor, while maintaining Euro 6 emissions standards.

A turbocharged Eco variant delivering  @ 4250 rpm and  @ 1650-4250 rpm  (overboost  ) has been introduced at 2012 Moscow International Automobile Salon (MIAS); a Performance version with maximum torque  and peak power  will also be available. Each version features unique turbine aerodynamic, and aggressive boost strategies improve low-end torque.

It uses a grey cast-iron block with die-cast aluminum bedplate, aluminum cylinder head, chain-driven DOHC valvetrain with hydraulic tensioners, dual continuous variable cam phasing, and forged steel crankshaft. The engine has twin balance shafts and specially designed cam cover to improve NVH, while optimized compressor geometry, acoustic resonators and overall air handling help reduce noise by 2 dB. Centrally placed injector allows optimal operation in both stratified and homogeneous charge ignition. Optimized main bearing journal diameter, roller cam followers, and PVD coated piston rings reduce friction.

Starting in 2013, the engine began to replace turbocharged 1.6 L Family I Ecotec engine in Opel cars, and in 2014-2015 it will replace naturally aspirated 1.6 L and 1.8 L Family 1 engines in Chevrolet cars. Starting with 2020 model year, this engine is no longer available for the United States market, due to Buick Cascada and Chevrolet Malibu Hybrid being phased out because of low sales and high importation taxes from Europe.

Models

Applications 
The  Eco version of the engine (code A16XHT) is used in:
2013 Opel Insignia
2013 Opel Astra J
2013 Opel Cascada
2013 Opel Zafira Tourer

The  Pro version of the engine (code A16SHT) is used in:
2014 Opel Astra J
2014 Opel Cascada
2014 Opel Zafira Tourer
2016 Buick Cascada (code LWC)
2016 Opel Astra K

The  Pro version of the engine (code B16SHT - Euro 6) is used in:
2018 - present Opel Astra K
2018 - present Opel Insignia B

The LKN is used in:
 2016 - 2019 Chevrolet Malibu Hybrid
 2016 - 2018 Buick LaCrosse 30H
 2016 - 2019 Buick Regal 30H

The 224 PS (165 kW) SAIC 20L4E (NetBlue) is used in:

2014 - present Maxus G10 (LDV G10 Australia) 
2015 - present MG GS 
2016 - present Roewe RX5
2017 - present Maxus T60 (LDV T60 Australia) 
2018 - present Maxus D90 (LDV D90 Australia) 
2018 - present Roewe RX8
2018 - present MG HS 
2019 - present Maxus G20 
2019 - present Maxus T70

The 234 PS (172 kW) SAIC 20A4E (NetBlue) is used in:

2020 - present Roewe iMAX8
2022 - present Roewe RX9

See also
GM Medium Diesel engine
GM Small Gasoline Engine
GM Family 1 engine
List of GM engines

References

External links

 http://gmpowertrain.com
 http://media.opel.com/content/autoshows/IAA_Frankfurt/2013/public/intl/en/opel/news.detail.html/content/Pages/news/intl/en/2013/opel/09-10-iaa-cascada-200-hp.html

General Motors engines
Opel engines

Straight-four engines
Gasoline engines by model